Nightly Pop is an American late night talk show that airs on E!. It premiered on October 29, 2018.

Premise 
This fresh and edgy late-night talk show, hosted by Morgan Stewart, Nina Parker and Hunter March, delves into the latest celebrity and pop culture news.

Cast 
The show currently stars Morgan Stewart, Hunter March and Nina Parker.

Production 
The show was announced by E! in October 2018.

The series premiered on October 29, 2018.

In August 2019, it was announced by E! that the show would be airing four nights a week starting in November 2019. E! also revealed many changes for the network in the upcoming year.

On November 8, 2019, E! Revealed that Nightly Pop will start airing four nights a week starting on November 17.

On March 13, 2020, it was announced that the show would be on hiatus until further notice alongside E! Daily Pop. They later returned in April 2020.

On August 26, 2022, It was announced that the show is cancelled and will end production in early October. It will replace with a new nightly show that will launch in late October.

The show wraps on September 22, 2022.

References 

E! original programming
2018 American television series debuts
2022 American television series endings
2010s American television talk shows
2020s American television talk shows
2010s American late-night television series
2020s American late-night television series
English-language television shows